Marina Puškar (Serbian Cyrillic: Марина Пушкар, born June 6, 1982, in Belgrade, SFR Yugoslavia) is a Serbian female basketball player.

External links
Profile at eurobasket.com

1982 births
Living people
Basketball players from Belgrade
Power forwards (basketball)
Centers (basketball)
Serbian expatriate basketball people in Italy
Serbian expatriate basketball people in Montenegro
Serbian expatriate basketball people in France
Serbian women's basketball players
ŽKK Crvena zvezda players
ŽKK Vojvodina players
ŽKK Spartak Subotica players